Domrud-e Amir may refer to:

Domrud-e Amir-e Olya
Domrud-e Amir-e Sofla
Domrud-e Amir-e Vosta